Lambert I may refer to:

 Lambert of Hesbaye (d. after 650)
 Lambert I of Nantes (d. 836)
 Lambert I of Spoleto (d. 880)
 Lambert I, Count of Louvain (c. 950 – 1015)
 Lamberto I da Polenta (d. 1316)